The Disappearance of Alice Creed  is a 2009 British neo-noir film written and directed by J Blakeson. It is about the kidnapping of a young woman (Gemma Arterton) by two ex-convicts (Martin Compston and Eddie Marsan). The film was shot on the Isle of Man.

Plot
Criminals Vic and Danny kidnap a woman named Alice Creed, the only child of a wealthy family. In a secured room, they forcibly strip her of all her clothes, handcuff her to a bed, and gag her – all while wearing jumpsuits and ski masks themselves. After taking pictures of her they put a tracksuit on her and a hood over her head. The men leave to dispose of all three's clothes and send the pictures to Alice's father for ransom. The men refuse to let her out of her shackles, even to go to the toilet, seemingly just to embarrass her. Neither shows emotion while humiliating Alice, but Vic mocks Danny for being less calm.

Vic leaves to make preparations, whilst Danny guards Alice. Alice persuades Danny to uncuff her, then grabs his pistol and fires a warning shot. To keep from being shot, Danny removes his ski mask and reveals he is her former lover. He says he met Vic while in prison and chose her as their victim. Danny plans to double-cross Vic and offers to start a new life with Alice and the money. As Vic returns, Alice agrees to go along with Danny's plan and be tied back up.

Later, when Vic is away again, Alice seduces Danny and handcuffs him to the bed, but finds the door bolted shut when she tries to escape. She finds a mobile phone and dials 999 but is unable to tell the operator where she is. She threatens Danny with his gun for the front door keys. Danny tells her they are in his pocket and knocks her out when she tries to retrieve them. Vic returns and says the exchange is on. Danny leaves the two and goes to the van.

Vic finds the mobile phone and sees the 999 call as well as the bullet hole in the wall. He ungags and threatens her. She screams for Danny, then tells Vic that Danny intends to double-cross him. Vic is shocked by the betrayal. When Danny returns, Vic says he feels something is 'not right', but Danny does not reveal anything. They inject Alice with a sedative and take her to a deserted, rural warehouse where they chain her in a back room. Vic asks Danny for his keys to the locks and drives him to the woods to pick up the ransom. There, Vic confronts Danny and threatens to kill both him and Alice. He says the hole they dug for the ransom is now for Danny. Danny flees, and Vic shoots him. Although wounded, Danny manages to hide. Vic retrieves the ransom elsewhere and returns for Alice. As he tries to inject her again, Danny appears and grabs his gun. In the struggle, Vic reveals to Alice that they were former lovers.

Danny shoots Vic point blank and, to Alice's horror, leaves her in the dark and handcuffed to the railing next to the dying man. However, Vic revives long enough to throw the keys to her. She frees herself and staggers out of the warehouse. Outside, Alice finds a car a short distance up the road, with the ransom on the passenger seat and Danny dead in the driver's seat. As she drives off with the money, the radio reports the news of her disappearance.

Cast 
 Gemma Arterton as Alice Creed
 Martin Compston as Danny
 Eddie Marsan as Vic

Filming
The film was shot on the Isle of Man and was largely filmed over four weeks in chronological order. Arterton insisted on being handcuffed to the bed even when not being filmed to help her performance. She joked that the crew used the gag prop to stop her chatting on set.

Soundtrack 
The score for the film was composed by Marc Canham and was his first film music having previously worked on music for video games. The piano, strings, and some of the percussion were recorded at Abbey Road Studios in London, whilst the remainder was recorded at Carnham's studio in Oxfordshire. The only other music used on the soundtrack was the song Holy Moly by Cathy Davey.

Release
The film was screened at the 2009 London Film Festival, the 2009 Toronto International Film Festival, and the Tribeca Film Festival in 2010.

After a well-publicised Facebook campaign to choose a cinema to host the World Premiere of the film, Southampton University Student's Union won the event, which took place on 20 April 2010.

Critical reception
The Disappearance of Alice Creed holds an 81% approval rating on Rotten Tomatoes, based on 99 reviews with an average rating of 6.9/10. According to Metacritic, which sampled the opinions of 19 critics and calculated a score of 65 out of 100, the film received "generally favorable reviews".

The film has received a number of four star ratings in the UK press. Peter Bradshaw at The Guardian made the following comment about the much discussed plot twists: "There's twist and counter-twist, cross and double-cross, and with each narrative reveal comes a firework display of Big Acting". It was well received at the Toronto International Film Festival (TIFF). Cameron Bailey, co-director of TIFF, praised J Blakeson's directorial style, claiming that "Not since Reservoir Dogs has a hostage standoff been handled with such intelligence".

The film was nominated for the Raindance Award at the 2009 British Independent Film Awards.

Home media
The film was released on DVD in the UK on 4 October 2010.

Remakes
In 2014, the Dutch-language remake Reckless was the opening film of the Netherlands Film Festival. The film closely follows the plot and structure of The Disappearance of Alice Creed.

In 2019, Netflix released Kidnapping Stella, a German remake of The Disappearance of Alice Creed. The film, directed by Thomas Sieben, centers 
around the abduction of Stella (Jella Haase) by Vic (Clemens Schick) and Tom (Max von der Groeben).

The films follow the setup of Italian kidnapping exploitation film La Orca (1976) with some plot variations.

References

External links
 
 
 
 
 

2009 independent films
2009 crime thriller films
2009 films
Bisexuality-related films
British crime thriller films
British independent films
British LGBT-related films
2009 directorial debut films
Films about kidnapping in the United Kingdom
Films shot in England
Films shot in the Isle of Man
Gay-related films
LGBT-related thriller films
Male bisexuality in film
Three-handers
Films directed by J Blakeson
2000s English-language films
2000s British films